Galur is an administrative village in the Johar Baru district of Indonesia. It has a postal code of 10530.

See also
 List of administrative villages of Jakarta

Administrative villages in Jakarta